The Holy Cross Crusaders men's ice hockey team is a National Collegiate Athletic Association (NCAA) Division I college ice hockey program that represents the College of the Holy Cross. The Crusaders are a member of the Atlantic Hockey Association (AHA). They play at the Hart Center in Worcester, Massachusetts.

History 
Holy Cross men's ice hockey began in 1966 and a year later it joined ECAC 2. The Crusaders played in the second tier of college ice hockey for ten years before they played their first playoff game, but once they made it they didn't go very far. Over a six year period Holy Cross wen 2–5 in the conference postseason and never really got close to an NCAA tournament berth. When Division II ice hockey was abandoned in 1984 Holy Cross dropped down to Division III and was placed in ECAC East when ECAC 2 split. They made the ECAC tournament three out of four years under Peter Van Buskirk but couldn't manage a win. The team went through a down period under Bill Bellerose for six seasons but started winning again when Paul Pearl became head coach in 1994. After recording their best season in fifteen years Holy Cross promoted its program to Division I and joined the MAAC in 1998–99.

In their first year of D–I play Holy Cross won its first Conference Tournament, winning the inaugural MAAC Championship. Unfortunately, because the NCAA did not offer the MAAC an automatic bid at that time the Crusaders did not make the NCAA tournament. The next season Holy Cross dropped to seventh in the conference and lost 24 games over the course of the season (a program worst). After missing out on the conference tournament the next season Holy Cross returned to the playoffs for the final two years of the MAAC's existence before joining with all former MAAC programs in founding Atlantic Hockey.

Similar to their start with the MAAC, Holy Cross produced a great season, winning 22 games, and were able to win their first conference title. They then swept through the Atlantic Hockey playoffs and captured their second tournament championship, though this time they received a berth into the NCAA tournament for the first time. Though their national championship experience was brief the Crusaders continued to play well and returned to the Championship in 2006 after winning both conference crowns. The met #2 overall seeded Minnesota in the first round and pushed the heavily favored Golden Gophers into overtime where Tyler McGregor scored 53 seconds in, winning what is usually noted as the biggest upset in tournament history.

Holy Cross would decline after their miraculous 2006 season, posting losing records for four consecutive years, but the program began to recover in the second decade of the 20th century. Paul Pearl resigned in 2014 and was replaced by David Berard and while the team hasn't played poorly, they've yet to win a round in the Atlantic Hockey Tournament (as of 2018).

Season-by-season results

Source:

Postseason

NCAA tournament results
The Crusaders have appeared in the NCAA Tournament two times. Their combined record is 1–2.

Coaches
As of completion of 2021–22 season

Awards and honors

NCAA

Derek Hines Unsung Hero Award
Matt Vidal: 2016

MAAC

Individual Awards

Offensive Player of the Year
Patrick Rissmiller, F: 2002
Brandon Doria, F: 2003

Goaltender of the Year
Scott Simpson: 1999

Offensive Rookie of the Year
Tyler McGregor, F: 2003

Coach of the Year
Paul Pearl: 2002

Tournament Most Valuable Player
Mike Maguire, D: 1999

All-Conference Teams
First Team All-MAAC

1998–99: Scott Simpson, G; Chris Fattey, F
2001–02: Patrick Rissmiller, F
2002–03: Brandon Doria, F

Second Team All-MAAC

1998–99: Mike Maguire, D
1999–00: Jim Whelan, D
2001–02: R. J. Irving, D; Brandon Doria, F

MAAC All-Rookie Team

1998–99: Patrick Rissmiller, F
2000–01: R. J. Irving, D; Greg Kealey, F
2002–03: Tyler McGregor, F

Atlantic Hockey

Individual Awards

Player of the Year
Tyler McGregor, F: 2006

Best Defensive Forward
Greg Kealey, C: 2004
Blair Bartlett, F: 2006
Rob Linsmayer, F: 2011

Best Defenseman
Rob Godfrey: 2006
Jon Landry: 2007

Individual Sportsmanship Award
Tim Coskren: 2004
Tyler McGregor: 2006
James Sixsmith: 2007

Regular Season Goaltending Award
Ben Conway: 2005
Tony Quesada: 2006

Regular Season Scoring Trophy
Tyler McGregor: 2006

Coach of the Year
Greg Kealey, F: 2004
James Sixsmith, LW: 2006

Most Valuable Player in Tournament
Tyler McGregor: 2006

All-Conference Teams
First Team All-Atlantic Hockey

2003–04: Jeff Dams, F
2004–05: Tyler McGregor, F
2005–06: Jon Landry, D; Tyler McGregor, F
2006–07: Jon Landry, D; James Sixsmith, F
2014–15: Matt Ginn, G
2017–18: Paul Berrafato, G

Second Team All-Atlantic Hockey

2003–04: Tony Quesada, G
2004–05: Pierre Napert-Frenette, F
2005–06: Tony Quesada, G; Pierre Napert-Frenette, F
2011–12: Adam Schmidt, F
2020–21: Matt Slick, D
2022–23: Jack Ricketts, F

Third Team All-Atlantic Hockey

2007–08: Matt Burke, D; Brodie Sheahan, F
2016–17: Spencer Trapp, D; Danny Lopez, F
2021–22: Ryan Leibold, F
2022–23: Nick Hale, D

Atlantic Hockey All-Rookie Team

2003–04: James Sixsmith, F
2007–08: Mark Znutas, D; Everett Sheen, F
2010–11: Jeffrey Reppucci, F
2011–12: Matt Ginn, G
2012–13: Karl Beckman, D
2018–19: Matt Slick, D; Anthony Vincent, F
2022–23: Mack Oliphant, D

Statistical leaders
Source:

Career points leaders

Career goaltending leaders

GP = Games played; Min = Minutes played; W = Wins; L = Losses; T = Ties; GA = Goals against; SO = Shutouts; SV% = Save percentage; GAA = Goals against average

Minimum 1000 minutes

Statistics current through the start of the 2018-19 season.

Holy Cross Varsity Club Hall of Fame
The following is a list of people associated with the Holy Cross men's ice hockey program who were elected into the Holy Cross Varsity Club Hall of Fame (induction date in parenthesis).

Larry Murphy (1981)
Gerry Curley (1996)
Jim Stewart (1998)
Joe Lunny (1999)
Glenn Graves (2000)
Bill Bellerose (2002)
Dean Casagrande (2002)
Matt Muniz (2005)
Patrick Rissmiller (2010)
Tyler McGregor (2013)
Tony Quesada (2014)
James Sixsmith (2017)
Terrence Butt (2018)

Current roster
As of August 4, 2022.

Crusaders in the NHL
As of July 1, 2022.

Source:

References

External links
Holy Cross Crusaders men's ice hockey

 
Ice hockey teams in Worcester, Massachusetts
1966 establishments in Massachusetts
Ice hockey clubs established in 1966